Souled Out (1998) was the second Souled Out professional wrestling pay-per-view (PPV) event produced by World Championship Wrestling (WCW) and sponsored by Snickers. The event took place on January 24, 1998 from the Hara Arena in Dayton, Ohio. Unlike the previous year's event, this year's event was billed as a joint production by WCW and the nWo (in storyline) and the pay-per-view events until the following year's Uncensored were jointly produced by WCW and the nWo.

The event featured a double main event. The first main event featured Bret Hart making his WCW in-ring debut against Ric Flair. Hart made Flair submit to the Sharpshooter. The second main event featured WCW's Lex Luger against nWo's Randy Savage. Luger made Savage submit to the Torture Rack.

The event featured several WCW vs. nWo matches. There were two singles matches as Larry Zbyszko and The Giant represented WCW against the nWo's Scott Hall and Kevin Nash in respective matches while WCW's Ray Traylor and The Steiner Brothers (Rick Steiner and Scott Steiner) took on the nWo's Konnan, Scott Norton and Buff Bagwell in a six-man tag team match. Aside from WCW vs. nWo matches, the WCW Cruiserweight Championship and the WCW World Television Championship were also defended at the event. Chris Benoit took on Raven in a Raven's Rules Match and a lucha libre cruiserweight eight-man tag team match also took place at the event.

Storylines
The event featured wrestlers from pre-existing scripted feuds and storylines. Wrestlers portrayed villains, heroes, or less distinguishable characters in the scripted events that built tension and culminated in a wrestling match or series of matches.

At Starrcade, Randy Savage provided a distraction to Lex Luger during his match against Savage's teammate Buff Bagwell, allowing Bagwell to win the match. Luger defeated Bagwell in a rematch the following night on Nitro and then challenged Savage to a match. Luger defeated Savage in a short match on the following week's Nitro. Luger then cost Savage, a match against Chris Adams by hitting Savage with a steel chair on the debut episode of Thunder. Later on the show, it was announced that Luger would face Savage at Souled Out.

Event

One notable moment of the night was when Kevin Nash attempted his Jackknife Powerbomb on The Giant. Nash was unable to lift the Giant high enough, and the impact caused the Giant to land on his head. The announcers were noticeably stunned as it appeared the Giant may have suffered a serious neck injury. While he ultimately recovered, Nash and the Giant would play it off as a deliberate move on Nash's part to try to break the Giant's neck.

Reception
In 2010, 411Mania staff gave the event a rating of 7.5 [Good], stating, "All the non-nWo stuff delivers, but all the nWo stuff pretty much sucks. Even though there's a lot to enjoy on this card, it still reminded me of a nursing home, since you could smell death coming.

Eric Bischoff was a one-trick pony for a booker. The only major angle he came up with was nWo. It got over huge, but once it was time to end it, he didn't. Instead of pushing talent the fans wanted to see, he shoved nWo down the fans' throats. Bischoff thought no matter how shitty the product was, people would still watch WCW over WWF. His method did in fact work for a while, but once people started seeing fresh talent, interesting characters, cussing, puppies, and aggressive violence - the WCW fans evolved into WWF fans.

I will have to give this a thumbs up, but do not say I didn't warn you about the nWo garbage."

Results

References

Souled Out
Events in Ohio
Professional wrestling in Ohio
1998 in Ohio
January 1998 events in the United States
1998 World Championship Wrestling pay-per-view events